St. Charles College may refer to:

St. Charles College (Louisiana), former Jesuit college in Grand Coteau, Louisiana
St. Charles College (Maryland), former Catholic seminary school in Ellicott City, Maryland
 St. Charles College (Missouri), former Methodist college in St. Charles, Missouri
 St. Charles Community College, in St. Charles County, Missouri
 St. Charles College, Pietermaritzburg, private boys' high school in KwaZulu-Natal province, South Africa
 St. Charles College (Sudbury), high school in Ontario, Canada
 St Charles Catholic Sixth Form College, in the Royal Borough of Kensington and Chelsea, London, England